Commitment is the third album by the Chicago-area rock band Lucky Boys Confusion, released on October 21, 2003. It is their second album released on a major label.

Track listing
 "Champions Dub" – 1:04
 "Hey Driver" – 2:36
 "Broken" – 3:08
 "Mr. Wilmington" – 3:20
 "Beware" – 3:06
 "Commitment" – 2:47
 "Atari" – 3:10
 "Sunday Afternoon (ft. Half-Pint)" – 3:52
 "Closer to Our Graves" – 3:32
 "Something to Believe" – 3:00
 "You Weren't There" – 1:30
 "Blame" – 2:51
 "South Union" – 0:43
 "Ordinary" – 2:30
 "Medicine and Gasoline" – 3:26
 "Champions" (Bonus Track)

Note: The Japanese version of this album contains the bonus track, "Soldier Song". The track, "Hey Driver", was featured in the Vegas Car Chase scene in Looney Tunes: Back in Action.

Personnel
 Kaustubh Pandav - vocals
 Adam Krier - guitars, backing vocals, piano, organ, keyboards, percussion
 Joe Sell - guitars
 Jason Schultejann- electric and upright bass, backing vocals
 Ryan Fergus - drums, backing vocals
 

Lucky Boys Confusion albums
2003 albums
Elektra Records albums